Littleton is an electoral division in County Tipperary in Ireland. The code number assigned it by the Central Statistics Office is 22071.

Electoral divisions were originally created in the 1830s as part of the implementation of the Poor Laws. Neighbouring divisions, such as Moycarkey, Ballymurreen, Rahealty and Twomileborris were created to help elect the Board of Guardians for the Thurles poor law union; however Littleton division was not created at that time. When it was finally created (which must have been before 1911 because it was used in the census that year and was probably before the 1891 census because the 1911 returns compared the divisional population with that in 1891 and 1901, which would have been meaningless if the areas were different), it was assembled from townlands taken from neighbouring divisions.

Relationship to civil parishes
At the time of both the 1911 and the 2011 census, the division included townlands from several civil parishes: Galbooly, Ballymoreen and Borrisleigh (or Two-Mile Burris or Two-mile-borris).

It contained three townlands (Galbooly, Galbooly Little, Shanacloon) of the six that belong to Galbooly civil parish, the other three townlands being in Thurles Rural electoral division.
It contained four townlands (Ballymurreen, Newtown, Rahinch and Rathcunikeen) of the seven that belong to Ballymoreen civil parish, the other three townlands being in Ballymurreen electoral division.
It contained nine townlands (Ballybeg, Ballydavid, Ballyerk, Ballynamona, Coolcroo,  Derryhogan, Lahardan Lower,  Lahardan Upper and Monaraheen) of the nineteen that belong to Borrisleigh civil parish, the others being distributed among Rahealty and Twomileborris electoral divisions.

Statistics
At the time of the 1891 census, the population was 901, living in 202 dwellings. At the time of the 1901 census, the population was 876, living in 183 dwellings.

At the time of the 1911 census, the total population of Littleton electoral division was 892, of which 460 were male and 432 female. There were 179 dwellings, of which 10 were vacant.

At the time of the 2011 census, the total population of the division was 1088, of which 551 were male and 537 female. There were 416 dwellings, of which 30 were vacant.

References

Electoral divisions in County Tipperary
Electoral divisions in North Tipperary